Forward Degree College (abbreviated as FDC) is a part of Forward System which is started after the establishment of Pakistan in 1949 to fill the vacuum created by closure of Non-Muslim educational institute in Peshawar after 1947. Forward Degree College is one of private colleges affiliated with University of Peshawar.

History 
Forward System was started by a worker of independence movement, Social Worker, Journalists, writer of many books and devoted educationist, of Khyber Pakhtunkhwa (KPK), Professor Muhammad Shafi Sabir in 1949 with Forward Schools in Peshawar City as a modest venture in private sector.

Forward System at Glance

Departments 
Chemistry
Physics
Computer Science
Islamic Studies
English
Economics
Sociology
Geography
Psychology
Philosophy 
Urdu

See also
University of Peshawar
Peshawar

References

External links
 Forward Degree College

Universities and colleges in Peshawar District